Hesar-e Olya (also Romanized as Ḩeşār-e ‘Olyā, Ḩeşār-e Owlyā, and Ḩeşār-e Owlīā; also known as ‘Olyā’ and Owlīā’) is a village in Behnamarab-e Jonubi Rural District, Javadabad District, Varamin County, Tehran Province, Iran. At the 2006 census, its population was 145, in 35 families.

References 

Populated places in Varamin County